Shaqilath (Nabataean Aramaic: , ŠQYLT; also spelled Shaqilat, Shaqeela, Shaqeelah, Šagīlat) was a queen of the Nabataeans.

She was the second wife and co-ruler of Aretas IV of the Nabataeans in AD 16–40.

She married King Aretas IV in 16 AD and had four children with him: Hagru or Hajir, Malik, Jameelah and Shaqilath II. 

Her role as queen and her proximity to the king is emphasized by her title "the Sister of the King".

During the reign of King Aretas IV and Shaqilat, the trades expanded to distant areas in the ancient world and industry, commerce and civilization of the Nabataeans flourished.

Copper and silver coins where she is depicted with her husband have been recovered and they offer expressive examples and models of the Nabataean civilization in terms of the culture of clothing.

See also
 List of rulers of Nabatea
 Shaqilath II

References

External links
"Women in Power" last accessed December 16, 2018
"Shaqilat" last accessed December 16, 2018

1st-century Nabataean monarchs
1st-century women rulers